Túbia Ribeiro (born 15 August 1966) is an Angolan footballer. He played in 18 matches for the Angola national football team from 1994 and 2000. He was also named in Angola's squad for the 1996 African Cup of Nations tournament.

References

1966 births
Living people
Angolan footballers
Angola international footballers
1996 African Cup of Nations players
Association football forwards
Footballers from Luanda